KXTL (1370 AM) is a radio station licensed to serve Butte, Montana.  The station is owned by Townsquare Media and licensed to Townsquare License, LLC.  It airs a talk radio format.

KXTL and its sister stations are all located at 750 Dewey Blvd. in Butte. The rear of this radio facility houses the small studios of the local NBC affiliate, KTVM Channel 6. The KXTL transmitter site is on Nissler Road, west of Butte.

The station was first licensed as KGIR on January 18, 1929. It changed its call letters to KXLF on November 20, 1946, became KCEZ on April 26, 1984 and has been assigned the KXTL call letters by the Federal Communications Commission since August 1, 1985.

Ownership
In June 2006, KXTL was acquired by Cherry Creek Radio from Fisher Radio Regional Group as part of a 24 station deal with a total reported sale price of $33.3 million.

References

External links
FCC History Cards for KXTL
KXTL official website
Cherry Creek Radio

 
 

Talk radio stations in the United States
XTL
Radio stations established in 1929
1929 establishments in Montana
Townsquare Media radio stations